Dr. William Sidney ("Sid") Gilchrist, (1901–1970), born in Pictou, Nova Scotia, Canada, spent 38 years as a medical missionary in Angola (formerly Portuguese West Africa).

Biography
Sid Gilchrist was the youngest of five children. His ancestry was Scottish and Presbyterian, and he graduated in medicine from Dalhousie University.

Two years before he completed his medical studies, Sidney Gilchrist married Frances Harriet Killam of Halifax. When he completed his medical studies they volunteered to go abroad as medical missionaries. In 1928 they were appointed to Angola by the Board of Overseas Missions of the United Church of Canada.

Before proceeding to the vast Portuguese colony on the west coast of Africa, the Gilchrists spent a year in Portugal, studying both Portuguese and the African languages spoken in Angola. During this time Dr. Gilchrist earned a Diploma in Tropical Medicine at the University of Lisbon. The Gilchrists arrived in Angola in 1930 and began their work in a part of the world where there was one doctor for every 100,000 people, where the average life expectancy was 30 years, and where 50% of infants died during the first year of life.

The Gilchrists were stationed at Camundongo, Angola, from 1930 to 1940, a term interrupted by a two-year furlough in 1935 and 1936. Dr. Gilchrist established a leprosy clinic in Camundongo, and he spent a great deal of time walking or bicycling to out-patient clinics and to native villages to treat sufferers who were unable or unwilling to visit the clinics.

When World War II began, he obtained a leave of absence from the Mission Board, enlisted in the Royal Canadian Army Medical Corps, and was attached to the North Nova Scotia Regiment. He remained with the Regiment, first in Nova Scotia and then in England, until 1943, when he was transferred to a field ambulance section and sent to North Africa. In the Mediterranean Theatre, first in North Africa and then in Italy, Dr. Gilchrist was called on both to treat wounded troops in the front lines and to combat disease. With his experience in tropical medicine, he performed especially valuable service in helping to reduce the rate of malaria and dysentery among allied troops in Italy. Dr. Gilchrist was discharged with the rank of Major in May, 1945. Two months later, in recognition of his wartime service, he was made a Member of the Order of the British Empire.

In 1947, the Gilchrists returned to Angola, this time to Dondi. Medical facilities here were more complete than those at Camundongo, and in addition to a well-equipped hospital, there were two schools; but the shortage of doctors at Dondi was just as acute. Dr. Gilchrist was faced with the task of running the hospital, the leper clinics, the village sanitation programs and the medical assistants' training program by himself.

Dr. Gilchrist's next mission station was at Bailundo, where he headed a mission to concentrate on preventive medicine. Within two years of his arrival, a new health-care centre and a maternity centre had been built. Further, he established an extensive system that served more than seventy villages with tuberculosis clinics, malaria surveys, maternity conferences, and training courses for midwives and medical assistants. The emphasis was always on prevention, and Dr. Gilchrist distributed an enormous amount of health-care literature.

By the early 1960s, the Gilchrists had come to consider Angola their home. Even though a Nova Scotia flag flew over the door of Dr. Gilchrist's office, he felt that, spiritually, he belonged to Africa. His writings show a deep love for all things African. He was a student of the customs and languages of many African peoples, spoke fluent Portuguese and Umbundu, and he developed a deep appreciation for the African landscape and all the creatures that lived on it.

Dr. Gilchrist died with his wife and daughter on June 14, 1970, in an automobile accident near Red Deer, Alberta. The couple had nine children, three of whom died in infancy and are buried in Africa. Their daughter Betty, a missionary like her parents, died with them in the automobile accident. Five sons survive, as of this entry.

Sidney Gilchrist's desire to help educate Angolan students in medicine was realized after his death, in the foundation of the Angola Memorial Scholarship Fund, which has contributed to the educational needs of Angolan students, whether within Angola, enrolled in foreign universities, or in refugee camp schools in Namibia during the Angolan Civil War, for the past thirty-five years.

A longer biography of Dr. Sid Gilchrist, originally provided by Dalhousie University Alumni, may be found on the Electric Scotland Website

References

External links

Two books, one written by him, Angola Awake, and the other about him, Salute to Sid, may be read online, by clicking on their cover jacket illustrations at 

1901 births
1970 deaths
Canadian military doctors
People from Pictou County
Canadian expatriates in Angola
Canadian Protestant missionaries
Protestant missionaries in Angola
Christian medical missionaries
University of Lisbon alumni
Dalhousie University alumni
Portuguese Angola
Health in Angola